Rahate Colony is a metro station on the Orange Line of the Nagpur Metro serving the Rahate Colony area of Nagpur. It was opened on 22 October 2020.

Station Layout

References

Nagpur Metro stations
Railway stations in India opened in 2020